Edward Albert Derrick (6 August 1939 – 27 June 2022) was a Welsh professional footballer who played as an inside forward in the Southern League for Merthyr Tydfil, Cambridge City, Hereford United and Worcester City. He also played two spells in the Football League for Newport County.

Personal life
Derrick's father Albert was also a footballer. Prior to signing for Newport County in December 1960, he served in the British Army. Derrick developed throat cancer later in life and lost part of his larynx.

Career statistics

Honours 
Hereford United

 Southern League First Division: 1964–65
 Herefordshire Senior Cup: 1966–67

References

1939 births
2022 deaths
Footballers from Newport, Wales
Welsh footballers
Newport County A.F.C. players
Hereford United F.C. players
English Football League players
Association football inside forwards
Southern Football League players
20th-century British Army personnel
Merthyr Tydfil F.C. players
Cambridge City F.C. players
Worcester City F.C. players

Barry Town United F.C. players